Gonçalo Bento Soares Cardoso (born 21 October 2000) is a Portuguese professional footballer who plays as a centre-back for Marítimo.

Career

Boavista
On 7 October 2018, Cardoso made his professional debut with Boavista in a 2018–19 Primeira Liga match against Desportivo das Aves, starting in the 1–0 home win. He was the second youngest player ever to play for the club, surpassing 
club legends such as Nuno Gomes and João Vieira Pinto.

West Ham United
In August 2019, he joined West Ham United on a five-year contract for an undisclosed fee. During the 2019–20 and 2020–21 seasons, Cardoso only featured for the U23's at West Ham playing regularly in the Premier League 2 and three appearances in the EFL Trophy.

Basel
On 30 January 2021, Cardoso signed for Swiss Super League side FC Basel on an 18-month loan deal with an option to buy. Basel confirmed the loan on the same day and Cardoso joined Basel's first team for the second half of their 2020–21 season under head coach Ciriaco Sforza. He played his domestic league debut for the club in the away game in the Letzigrund on 14 February 2021 as Basel were defeated 0–2 by Zürich. He scored his first goal for the club just three days later on 17 February in the Swiss Cup game in the St. Jakob Stadium as Basel were beaten 2–6 by Winterthur. During a training in March Cardoso injured himself and could not play for the rest of the season.

At the beginning of the following season he played in five test games and made an 90 minute appearance in a Swiss Cup match. However the injury re-occurred and the loan contract was dissolved a few months later. During his short period with the club, Cardoso played a total of 13 games for Basel scoring the afore mentioned one goal. Five of these games were in the Swiss Super League, two in the Swiss Cup and six were friendly games.

Real Betis
On 20 January 2022, Cardoso moved on a new loan to Real Betis in Spain and was assigned to the B-team.

Marítimo
On 1 September 2022, Cardoso returned to Portugal to sign for C.S. Marítimo.

International career
On 17 November 2018, Cardoso made his Portugal U19 debut in an international friendly against Armenia U19. He also helped his side get the final of the 2019 UEFA European Under-19 Championship scoring in Portugal's opening group stage fixture against Italy, and while he played in every minute of the campaign for his side, they eventually lost to Spain in the final.

Cardoso also made five appearances for Portugal U20 in the 2019–20 Under 20 Elite League before it was eventually cancelled due to the COVID-19 pandemic.

Career statistics

References

External links

2000 births
Living people
People from Marco de Canaveses
Portuguese footballers
Portugal youth international footballers
Association football defenders
Boavista F.C. players
West Ham United F.C. players
FC Basel players
Betis Deportivo Balompié footballers
Primeira Liga players
Swiss Super League players
Primera Federación players
Portuguese expatriate footballers
Expatriate footballers in England
Portuguese expatriate sportspeople in England
Expatriate footballers in Switzerland
Portuguese expatriate sportspeople in Switzerland
Expatriate footballers in Spain
Portuguese expatriate sportspeople in Spain
Sportspeople from Porto District